LHS 1140 b is a massive, dense rocky planet orbiting within the conservative habitable zone of the red dwarf LHS 1140. Discovered in 2017 by the MEarth Project, LHS 1140 b is nearly 7 times the mass of Earth and over 60% larger in radius, putting it within the Super-Earth category of planets. It is one of the densest planets found, with a density almost twice that of Earth, along with a high surface gravity of about 2.41 Earth's. LHS 1140 b orbits entirely within the star's habitable zone and gets 41% the incident flux of Earth. The planet is only 40 light-years away and transits its star, making it an excellent candidate for atmospheric studies with ground-based and/or space telescopes.

Host star

LHS 1140 b orbits a very small red dwarf, LHS 1140. It is a mere 0.146 times the mass and 0.186 times the radius of the Sun with a spectral type of M4.5V. The temperature of LHS 1140 is 3216 K, and it has a luminosity of 0.00441 LS. It is at least 5 billion years old. For comparison, the Sun is 1 solar mass and radius, has a temperature of 5778 K with 1 solar luminosity, is 4.5 billion years old, and has the spectral type of G2V. In addition, LHS 1140 is a very inactive star, with no major flare events found by the discovery team of its planet. Unlike most stars its size, LHS 1140 has low amounts of activity and rotates every 130 days.

Characteristics

Mass and radius
LHS 1140 b was detected using both the radial velocity method (which measures the mass of a companion object) and transit photometry (which determines radius). Because of this, LHS 1140 b is one of very few potentially habitable exoplanets with a determined mass and radius, the others all being those around TRAPPIST-1. The planet's radius is well-constrained at 1.641 ±0.048 , equivalent to about 10,450 km. It is one of the smallest radius values for any potentially habitable planet and similar to that of Kepler-62f.

Orbit and temperature
The orbit of LHS 1140 b takes 24.737 days to complete, much quicker than Earth's year of 365 days. Its orbital radius is at 0.0875 AU, or 8.75% the distance between Earth and the Sun. While this is quite close, the star LHS 1140 is so dim that the planet only gets 0.41 times the incident flux of Earth at this distance. Due to the high mass of the planet, it likely has a thicker atmosphere with a more powerful greenhouse effect. Like many other potentially habitable red dwarf planets, the orbit of LHS 1140 b is quite circular: the eccentricity is measured to be lower than 0.29 to a 90% confidence. However, unlike many other red dwarf planets, the circularization of the orbit cannot be explained by stellar tides, and thus the circularity of the orbit is likely to be natal.

Internal composition
Initially the planet was believed to have an extremely high density around 12.5 g/cm3, one of the highest ever observed for a rocky planet and over twice the density of Earth, with an iron-nickel core taking up to 75% of the planet's total mass. Later estimates have resulted in lower density of 7.82g/cm3, and lower core mass fraction of 45%. For comparison, Earth's core comprises about 32.5% of its mass.

Indeed, the water vapor in atmosphere of LHS 1140 b was detected in late 2020, albeit at low signal-to-noise ratio.

Habitability
LHS 1140 b orbits close to the outer edge of the habitable zone, a region around a star where temperatures are just right for liquid water to pool on the surface of orbiting planets, given sufficient atmospheric pressure. However, this is the calculated temperature excluding the impact of a thick atmosphere. In addition, the host star is so inactive that atmospheric erosion will not be very high, suggesting the planet should be able to retain its atmosphere over long timescales.

See also
 Nearby potentially habitable exoplanets
 Proxima Centauri b
 Ross 128 b
 Luyten b
 Gliese 832 c
 TRAPPIST-1d
 TRAPPIST-1e
 TRAPPIST-1f
 TRAPPIST-1g
 K2-3d, the densest and most massive rocky habitable zone planet
 Kepler-1652b, a potentially habitable "Mega-Earth"
 Habitability of red dwarf systems
 List of potentially habitable exoplanets

References

Super-Earths in the habitable zone
Transiting exoplanets
Super-Earths
Exoplanets discovered in 2017
Cetus (constellation)